Tiffany Haddish is an American stand-up comedian and actress known for her appearances in film and television. She garnered critical acclaim for her performance in the comedy film Girls Trip (2017) and received various critics awards nominations. She also won a Primetime Emmy Award for Outstanding Guest Actress in a Comedy Series for her hosting gig on Saturday Night Live in 2018. She also received her first Grammy Award nomination in 2019 for Best Spoken Word Album for The Last Unicorn before winning Best Comedy Album for Black Mitzvah in 2021. She is the second African-American to win the category after Whoopi Goldberg in 1986.

Major associations

Grammy Awards
A Grammy Award is an award presented by the Recording Academy to recognize achievements in the music industry.

Primetime Emmy Awards
A Primetime Emmy Award is an American award bestowed by the Academy of Television Arts & Sciences in recognition of excellence in American primetime television programming.

Critics Awards

African-American Film Critics Association

Alliance of Women Film Journalists

American Black Film Festival

Critics' Choice Movie Awards

Detroit Film Critics Society

Empire Awards

Essence Black Women in Hollywood Awards

New York Film Critics Circle

Online Film Critics Society

Washington D.C. Area Film Critics

Miscellaneous Awards

BET Awards
The BET Awards were established in 2001 by the Black Entertainment Television network to celebrate African-Americans and other minorities in music, acting, sports, and other fields of entertainment over the past year.

Black Reel Awards
The Black Reel Awards is an annual American awards ceremony hosted by the Foundation for the Augmentation of African-Americans in Film (FAAAF) to recognize excellence in African-American, as well as those of African diaspora's cinematic achievements in the around the world film industry as assessed by the Academy's voting membership.

MTV Movie and TV Awards

NAACP Image Awards

References

Haddish, Tiffany